The Pikes Peak International Hill Climb (PPIHC), also known as The Race to the Clouds, is an annual automobile hillclimb to the summit of Pikes Peak in Colorado, USA. It used to consist of both gravel and paved sections, but as of August 2011, the highway is fully paved; as a result, all subsequent events will be run on asphalt from start to finish.

The race is self-sanctioned and has taken place since 1916. It is currently contested by a variety of vehicle classes. The PPIHC operates as the Pikes Peak Auto Hill Climb Educational Museum to organize the annual motorsports event.

History

Early history
The first Pikes Peak Hill Climb was promoted by Spencer Penrose, who had converted the narrow carriage road into the much wider Pikes Peak Highway.

The first Penrose Trophy was awarded in 1916 to Rea Lentz with a time of 20:55.60. In the same year Floyd Clymer won the motorcycle class with a time of 21:58.41. In 1924 the final Penrose Trophy was awarded to Otto Loesche in his Lexington Special. In the years following, Glen Scultz and Louis Unser shared a rivalry and won the event 12 times between them. In 1929 the popular stock car class was added to the event.

Following World War Two, Louis Unser returned to his winning ways at Pikes Peak, winning three more times between 1946 and 1970; these wins were tightly contended with rival Al Rogers. During this time the event was part of the AAA and USAC IndyCar championship. In 1953, the Sports Car Club of America (SCCA) sponsored the event, bringing with it an influx of sports cars. In this period the course record was broken every year from 1953 until 1962, this is the largest string of record breaking runs in the event's history. The majority of these records were set by Louis' nephew, Bobby Unser. In 1954 motorcycles returned to the event, the first time since its inception in 1916. The motorcycle overall victory that year went to Bill Meier riding a Harley-Davidson motorcycle.

In 1971 the event was won by the first non-gasoline vehicle (propane), this was also the first overall victory from the stock car class (1970 Ford Mustang), the car was driven by the Danish-American Ak Miller.

European involvement
In 1984 the first European racers took part in the PPIHC with Norwegian Rallycrosser Martin Schanche (Ford Escort Mk3 4x4) and French Rally driver Michèle Mouton (Audi Sport quattro), thereby starting a new era for European teams in the almost unknown American hillclimb. While Schanche failed to set a new track record due to a flat right front tire, Mouton (together with her World Rally Championship co-driver Fabrizia Pons from Italy) won the Open Rally category but failed to win the event overall. Mouton achieved the overall victory and course record of 11:25.39 in the following year.

In 1989, an award-winning short film about the 1988 event was released by French director Jean-Louis Mourey. The film, titled Climb Dance, captured the efforts of Finnish former World Rally Champion Ari Vatanen, as he won the event in a record-breaking time with his turbocharged Peugeot 405 Turbo 16.

Paving of the highway
The City of Colorado Springs began to pave the highway in 2002 after losing a lawsuit against the Sierra Club, which sued on account of erosion damage to streams, reservoirs, vegetation and wetlands downstream from the 1.5 million tons of road gravel deposited over several decades. The local authority paved approximately 10% of the route each year after the order. The 2011 event was the last race with dirt sections, comprising approximately 25% of the course.

During this evolutionary period of the event, the Japanese driver Nobuhiro Tajima with Suzuki cars scored 6 overall victories (2006 - 2011) and two course records. His 2011 record was the first to break the 10 minute barrier.

Hill Climb champion Rod Millen warned at the time that paving the road would put an end to the race. However, the 2012 race saw over 170 racer registrations by December 2011, compared with 46 at the same time the previous year.

The 90th running of the event happened in 2012 and saw a larger field and a longer race day than ever before. This was the first time the race has been run on all asphalt leading to the breaking of several records, notably the overall record, which fell numerous times during the event finally falling to Rhys Millen the son of previous event winner Rod Millen, in the Time Attack Division. During the event Mike Ryan spun his big rig in a hairpin in a section called the "W"s, hitting the guard rail, he then managed to execute a three-point turn and continued on course, at which point he broke his old record by 5 seconds. This highlighted the change that a fully paved course made to the speed of the event. The 2012 event also saw the first motorcycle to achieve a sub 10 minute time with the late Carlin Dunne in the 1205 Division riding a Ducati with a time of 9:52.819 which was only 1.5 seconds slower than the previous year's overall record.

2013 saw the nine-minute barrier shattered by WRC legend Sébastien Loeb (Peugeot 208 T16 Pikes Peak), with a time of 8:13.878, while Rhys Millen ended up second with 9:02.192, beating his own record by more than 44 seconds. Jean-Philippe Dayrault finished third with a time of 9:42.740, and Paul Dallenbach fourth with a time of 9:46.001, making it four drivers to beat the overall record set only the previous year.

Emergence of electric vehicles
Electric cars have featured on and off in the PPIHC since the early 1980s. In 1981 Joe Ball took a Sears Electric Car to the top in 32:07.410, in 1994 Katy Endicott brought her Honda to the top in 15:44.710 and in 2013 Nobuhiro Tajima broke the 10 minute barrier with a time of 9:46.530 in his E-RUNNER Pikes Peak Special. In the following years electric entries would become more common, steadily breaking their powertrain records and eventually the overall record in 2018.

For hill-climb events, and this event in particular, it is reasonable to suggest that a modern, well designed electric car will be at an advantage over internal combustion engined cars. The issue of limited range does not apply to short sprints and the twisty nature of the Pikes Peak course lends itself well to the almost instant torque delivery of electric motors. Additionally, the lowering air density of high altitudes does not reduce the power available to the driver as it does with air-breathing engines.

Although the 2014 event was won by a gasoline powered car; second (Greg Tracy), third (Hiroshi Masuoka) and fourth (Nobuhiro Tajima) places overall were taken by electric cars.
In 2015, electric cars placed first (Rhys Millen) and second (Nobuhiro Tajima) overall. In an interview with Rhys Millen, he said that he had lost power to the car's rear motor pack before the halfway point. Had this not happened he had expected his run to be 30 seconds faster.
In 2016 gasoline again took top honors but electric completed the podium taking second (Rhys Millen) and third (Tetsuya Yamano) as well as fifth (Nobuhiro Tajima) places overall.

At the 2018 event, an electric car set a new overall record for the first time in the event's history as Frenchman Romain Dumas completed the course in the all-electric Volkswagen I.D. R with a time of 7:57.148, breaking the 8 minute barrier for the first time.

The death of motorcyclist Carlin Dunne during the 2019 race forced the organization to postpone all motorcycle racing at the event. This decision will be reviewed following the 2021 running of the event.

Racing divisions
The Pikes Peak International Hill climb currently consists of six divisions.

Unlimited
Anything goes in the Unlimited Division as long as it passes safety inspection and meets the PPIHC's general rules. The Unlimited Division features the most exotic vehicles, most of them built specifically for this race. These race cars have the best chance of setting a new overall race record. In 2018, Romain Dumas set a new record of 7 minutes 57.148 seconds in the all-electric Volkswagen I.D. R Pikes Peak, beating Sébastien Loeb's previous record by over 15 seconds.

Time Attack 1
A division for production based two- and four-wheel drive vehicles. Only closed cockpit four-wheeled vehicles are allowed to participate.

Porsche Pikes Peak Trophy by Yokohama
Making its debut at the 2018 event was the first official one-make Porsche category, exclusive to the Porsche Cayman GT4 Clubsport in four variants — Clubsport, Clubsport Trophy Specification, Clubsport MR, and Clubsport 2017 IMSA GS.

Open Wheel
The traditional Pikes Peak single-seater race cars with designs ranging from Indy style sprinters to dune buggies. Open-wheel cars have competed in every event since the inaugural race in 1916.

Pikes Peak Open
Production based vehicles with unlimited permitted modifications.

Exhibition Class
In keeping with the mission statement of the event, specifically to "demonstrate advancements in the practical application of motor sports technology", the race encourages competitors with vehicles that do not meet the technical specifications of PPIHC sanctioned divisions to enter in the Exhibition Class. While there are no class records for this class because of its exhibition status, entries are eligible for recording an overall course record as well as an attempt at records achieved by former classes.

Race records
Below follows all currently recognised records. Records set during the most recent running of the event are in bold type.

Division and class records

Non-division and class records

There is 7mm:70 s:032 between the first and the last stopwatch

Winners
The overall honours have always fallen to vehicles in car divisions, however motorcycles have their own divisions, records and winners. Cars have entered the event every year since its inception in 1916 (with the exception of years during the world wars) whereas motorcycles have only entered in a limited number of years.

Overall winners

Overall winners can compete under any division, although the majority come from the open wheel and more recently the unlimited division. A time in italics indicates this was a previous course record, a time in bold indicates the current course record.

Motorcycle winners
Motorcycle winners can compete under any division, although the majority come from open or large displacement classes. A time in italics indicates this was a previous motorcycle record, a time in bold indicates the current motorcycle record.

On 30 June 2019, four-time Pikes Peak International Hill Climb winner Carlin Dunne was killed in a crash at the race. He crashed less than a quarter of a mile from the finish line.

See also
 Mont Ventoux Hill Climb, started in 1902
 Silverstone Race to the Sky (now the longest gravel hill climb in the world)
 Shelsley Walsh Speed Hill Climb (one of the oldest motorsport events in the world)
 Giants Despair Hillclimb and Rest and Be Thankful Speed Hill Climb, both started in 1906
 Mount Washington Hillclimb Auto Race (one of the oldest auto races in the United States)

Notes

References

External links

Official Website
All Time Kings of the Mountain (1916-2019)

Hillclimbs
Sports competitions in Colorado Springs, Colorado
Pikes Peak
Rally America
Motorsport in Colorado
Green racing